Nicholas Allen Jones (born 20 January 1969), known as Nicky Wire, is a Welsh musician and songwriter, best known as lyricist, bassist and secondary vocalist of the Welsh alternative rock band Manic Street Preachers.

Prior to the group, Wire studied politics at university: this would later influence his lyrical work. He was co-writer of the band's lyrics (alongside Richey Edwards) from 1989 to 1995, and has been the band's primary lyricist since 1995, following Edwards' disappearance. In addition to his work with Manic Street Preachers, Wire released a solo album, I Killed the Zeitgeist, in 2006.

Biography

Early life
Born Nicholas Allen Jones in Llanbadoc, Monmouthshire, Wales, Wire is the younger brother of poet and author Pat Jones. He attended Oakdale Comprehensive School with James Dean Bradfield, Sean Moore and Richey Edwards. Wire played competitive schools football and, aged 14, was captain of the Welsh national schoolboys' team. Although he was offered a trial at both Tottenham Hotspur and Arsenal football clubs, back and knee problems brought his football career to an end. Wire took A-levels in politics and law. He later attended Portsmouth Polytechnic, but after several months transferred to the University of Wales Swansea, starting his course a year after Edwards. He graduated with a Lower Second-Class Honours degree in politics, which has led him to comment that he may have pursued a career in the diplomatic service or the Foreign and Commonwealth Office.

Career
Wire is a founding member of Manic Street Preachers and was originally rhythm guitarist but changed to playing the bass guitar after original bassist Flicker left the band. He co-wrote the band's lyrics with Richey Edwards between 1989 and 1995, taking over sole responsibility following Edwards's disappearance. Some of Edwards' lyrics were used on 1996's Everything Must Go album, making 1998's This Is My Truth Tell Me Yours the first album with lyrics by Wire alone. Wire usually plays Gibson Thunderbird, Rickenbacker, Fender Jazz and most recently Italia Maranello basses, one of which is a custom acoustic model made by request for the band's 2007 acoustic sessions.

Nicky chose the pseudonym Wire because of his lanky, "wiry" frame (he is 6'3"). He often dons a dress or a skirt for his group's gigs although he has curtailed his flamboyance somewhat in recent years. Wire's cross-dressing dates back to his teens, when he would go to local pubs in Blackwood wearing a dress; he has, however, been keen to emphasise that he is not transgender . He puts his attraction to glam and women's clothes at least in part down to his very close relationship with his mother.

Wire is notorious for his outspoken attitude and has been known to cause controversy in the press. He once stated during a 1992 gig, "In this season of goodwill, let’s pray that Michael Stipe goes the same way as Freddie Mercury pretty soon". However, he has since expressed regret for the remark; stating that it was misinterpreted and "didn't come out the way [he] wanted it to." Wire has noted that his band has taken "inspiration from Queen," Mercury's band, as well as being noted fans of R.E.M.'s earlier albums.

In November 2007, he was recruited as Chair of the Advisory Board for the new commercial Xfm South Wales Radio Station.

Solo career
On Christmas Day 2005, the Manics posted a solo track by Wire called "I Killed the Zeitgeist", available to download free for one day. In early May, the rumoured first single entitled "Break My Heart Slowly" from his début solo album premièred on BBC Radio 6 Music with Phill Jupitus.

Wire played an intimate solo gig at the Hay Festival on 5 June 2006. The setlist consisted of material from his forthcoming album. Also included was a short acoustic rendition of "Condemned to Rock 'N' Roll" from Manic Street Preachers' début album Generation Terrorists. Speaking to NME.COM before the gig, Wire confirmed that he was currently working on a solo album and he'd already written 25 songs.
On the following day, Wire released the free track "Daydreamer Eyes" on his new website. He released the single "The Shining Path" as an exclusive iTunes only download on 17 July. His solo album, entitled I Killed the Zeitgeist was released on 25 September, with the single "Break My Heart Slowly" released on 18 September.

In an interview with New Musical Express in March 2020, that also confirmed work on a 2021 Manic Street Preachers album and a solo album by bandmate James Dean Bradfield, Wire announced that he was working on more solo content, joking that he would not have to put in much work to meet fan demand. Bradfield later reconfirmed this, likening their simultaneous solo work to when they did the same in 2006.

Personal life
Wire married his childhood sweetheart, Rachel, on 25 September 1993. He missed the band's appearance on Top of the Pops to promote "Roses in the Hospital" because of the honeymoon and was replaced on the day by a Manic Street Preachers roadie wearing a Minnie Mouse mask. The couple live in the Newport suburb of Allt-yr-yn with daughter Clara Enola (born 2002) and son Stanley McCarthey (2007).

The family previously lived in a terrace house in the village of Wattsville, near Blackwood. Although he was annoyed when a British tabloid revealed that he lived there, printing a picture of his house with the number clearly visible, he later paid public tribute to his former home in the title of the track "Wattsville Blues," on Know Your Enemy album.

Wire follows the Welsh rugby union team, Whiteheads RFC and Dragons. He is also a fan of Warrington Wolves rugby league team, (who are nicknamed The Wire), as well as being a supporter of Tottenham Hotspur in football, with whom he turned down an offer of a trial as a teenager.

Musical equipment

Bass guitars
Fender Precision Bass
Fender Jazz Bass (with custom third pickup)
Rickenbacker 4003
Gibson Thunderbird
Italia Maranello

Amplification
Ampeg SV-2
Ampeg SV-32
Ampeg 8x10 cabinets

Solo discography
Albums
I Killed the Zeitgeist (25 September 2006) – No. 130 UK

Singles
"I Killed the Zeitgeist" (Free download from the official Manic Street Preachers website, 25 December 2005)
"Daydreamer Eyes" (Limited free download from his official solo site, June 2006)
"The Shining Path" (Exclusive iTunes only download, 17 July 2006)
"Break My Heart Slowly" (18 September 2006) – #74

References

External links

 Nicky Wire biography from BBC Wales
 Video – Nicky Wire talks to the BBC about the early days of the manics, and receiving the NME Godlike Genius award

1969 births
Living people
Alternative rock bass guitarists
Alternative rock singers
Alumni of Swansea University
Manic Street Preachers members
People educated at Oakdale Comprehensive School
People from Blackwood, Caerphilly
People from Tredegar
Welsh baritones
Welsh male singers
Welsh rock bass guitarists
Welsh rock singers
Welsh socialists
Welsh songwriters
Welsh people of English descent
Male bass guitarists
Welsh republicans